KHUG-LP is a low power FM station broadcasting on 97.5 MHz from Castaic, California. It is licensed to Sloan Canyon Communications, a California non-profit corporation and serves the communities in the Santa Clarita Valley (SCV), California.

History
Sloan Canyon Communications was granted a construction permit by the FCC on July 10, 2015. The first broadcast occurred January 20, 2017, as it signed on as KZPC-LP. Three days later, when the FCC granted a pending call sign change to KHUG-LP, the station started using the new call sign on January 24, 2017.

The station programs primarily music, using the slogan, "Classic Rock By Day, Blues and R&B by night." The station claims that 15 to 20% of its evening blues and R&B rotation is made up of local artists.

References

External links
 Official Website
 

Mass media in Los Angeles County, California
Radio stations established in 2017
2017 establishments in California
HUG-LP
HUG-LP